The SEABA Under-18 Championship is an under-18 basketball championship in the International Basketball Federation's Southeast Asia Basketball Association, one of FIBA Asia's subzone. The event started in 1996 and is held bi-annually (except in 2000). The winners represent SEABA in the FIBA Asia Under-18 Championship.

The Philippines were the defending champions, and the most successful team in the subzone, have won their fifth straight title since 2008 and their eight title overall. Malaysia have won the other two titles, in 2002 and 2006 and consistently the second-best team in the region.

Summary

Medal table

References

 
Under-18 basketball competitions between national teams
Basketball competitions in Asia between national teams
1996 establishments in Southeast Asia
Recurring sporting events established in 1996
Biennial sporting events